Frank Leith Jones Jr. (born 5 September 1951) is an American academic, public servant and military historian. He published his first book in 2013, Blowtorch: Robert Komer, Vietnam, and American Cold War Strategy, a biography of Robert Komer who served as "national security policy and strategy adviser" to three Presidents. In 2020, he published Sam Nunn: Statesman of the Nuclear Age, a study of the impact Senator Nunn had on US national security and policy during the Cold War and its immediate aftermath.

Early life and education 

Frank Leith Jones was born in Boston, Massachusetts. He earned a Bachelor of Arts degree from St. Lawrence University, a Master of Public Administration degree from the University at Albany (SUNY), and a PhD in Political Science from Griffith University, Queensland, Australia.

Career

Public Service 
Jones first joined the United States Army as a commissioned officer during the Vietnam era. In 1979, he switched to public service as a civilian serving as a President Management Intern with the Department of the Army. Subsequently, he held a number of high-ranking positions in the Department of Defense. In 2006, he retired as a career member of the Senior Executive Service.

Academia 
After leaving public service, Jones turned to teaching Security Studies as a professor at the U.S Army War College in Carlisle, PA.

Awards 
Jones was awarded the "Brigadier General James L. Collins Jr. Book Prize In Military History" for the best book written in English on U.S. military history, 2015 by the U.S. Commission on Military History.

Selected publications 
 A "Hollow Army" Reappraised: President Carter, Defense Budgets, and the Politics of Military Readiness.
 Blowtorch : Robert Komer, Vietnam, and American Cold War strategy. Annapolis, Maryland : Naval Institute Press, [2013] . OCLC 813910349.
 Sam Nunn: Statesman of the Nuclear Age. Lawrence, KS : University Press of Kansas, [2020] . OCLC 1145089936.

Personal 
Jones is the son of Frank Leith Jones Sr. and Marie Clementine Smith.

On 29 January 1977, Jones Jr. married Sharon Marie Peters in Virginia Beach, Virginia.

References

External links 
 Frank Leith Jones in a panel on the Vietnam War
 

1951 births
Living people
People from Boston
St. Lawrence University alumni
United States Army officers
University at Albany, SUNY alumni
Griffith University alumni
American military historians
United States Army War College faculty
Historians from New York (state)
Military personnel from Massachusetts